Queen Street is one of the major thoroughfares in the city of Glasgow, Scotland. The street runs north from Argyle Street (parallel to nearby Buchanan Street) until it reaches George Square at the junction with St. Vincent Street. Several local landmarks are located on this street including Royal Exchange Square, with the Gallery of Modern Art at the junction with Ingram Street.

George Square is at the northern end of the street, as is Queen Street Station, the second busiest railway station in Glasgow. With several major streets in the city centre pedestrianised, Queen Street and Ingram Street form part of a major taxi and bus corridor for services travelling to the eastern and southern parts of the city.

See also
2014 Glasgow bin lorry crash
Glasgow Queen Street railway station
List of Category A listed buildings in Glasgow
Merchant City
Tam Shepherds Trick Shop

References

Streets in Glasgow